Tom Robertson (born 28 August 1994) is an Australian rugby union football player. Robertson's position is prop, and he can play on either tight-head or loose-head side.

Early life
Robertson was born in Wellington, New South Wales, and spent his early years in Dubbo where he played junior rugby for the Dubbo Kangaroos. He later attended St Joseph's College, Hunters Hill, where he played in the 1st XV rugby team as a loose-head prop. He was selected for the Australian Schoolboys side in 2012, winning the Trans-Tasman Shield in New Zealand.

Career
After joining the Sydney University rugby club and making his debut in the Shute Shield, Robertson was selected to represent Australia at the 2014 IRB Junior World Championship hosted by New Zealand. Later that year he was chosen in the Sydney Stars squad to compete in the inaugural National Rugby Championship.

Robertson began studying for a medical degree at Sydney University in 2016, and also signed a contract with the NSW Waratahs for the 2016 season. He made his debut for the Waratahs against the Highlanders on 18 March 2016 and scored a try on debut.

In 2023, Robertson was awarded a John Monash Scholarship to undertake a Master of International Health and Tropical Medicine at Oxford University.

References

External links
 
 Waratahs profile

1994 births
Living people
Australian rugby union players
New South Wales Waratahs players
Sydney Stars players
Rugby union props
People educated at St Joseph's College, Hunters Hill
Australia international rugby union players
New South Wales Country Eagles players
Western Force players
Rugby union players from New South Wales